Princess Wonsin of the Incheon Yi clan was the third wife of her first cousin, King Seonjong of Goryeo.

She firstly honoured as Consort Wonhui (원희궁비, 元嬉宮妃), but after her older brother, Yi Ja-ui (이자의) was executed by Duke Gyerim on the charge of plotting treason to make Wonhui's son as the new king instead of Gyerim, she was implicated in this and along with her son, they were exiled to Gyeongwon-gun (nowadays is the parts of Incheon). In 1101, a pardon was issued for those who involved in the Ja-ui's case and after Crown Prince Wang U ascended the throne, the Incheon Yi clan's people can gained their position again in the court and Yi Ja-gyeom's daughter was chosen as the new queen consort for Yejong.

References

External links
Princess Wonsin on Encykorea .
원신궁주 on Doosan Encyclopedia .

Royal consorts of the Goryeo Dynasty
11th-century Korean people
Year of birth unknown
Year of death unknown
Incheon Lee clan